Christine Louise Lampard (née Bleakley, born 2 February 1979) is a Northern Irish broadcaster. She has presented various television programmes with Adrian Chiles, such as The One Show (2007–2010) and Daybreak (2010–11), while with Phillip Schofield she has presented Dancing on Ice (2012–14) and This Morning (2013–16). Lampard has also presented factual series for ITV including Off The Beaten Track (2013) and Wild Ireland (2015). Since 2016 she has been a presenter of the ITV lunchtime chat show Loose Women.

Early life
Christine Bleakley  was born in Daisy Hill Hospital, Newry, and grew up in Newtownards. She has a younger sister, Nicola. She started her television career as a runner and then trained to become a floor manager while studying for her A-Levels at Bloomfield Collegiate School in Ballyhackamore, Belfast. She continued to work at BBC NI while studying for a politics degree at Queen's University, Belfast. However, she did not complete her degree course, and instead moved into television work full-time.

Career

BBC
She worked on the long-running BBC Northern Ireland comedy Give My Head Peace. She returned to make a cameo appearance in the show in its 2016 special.

She moved into television with BBC Northern Ireland hosting a wide variety of shows. One of her programmes was called Sky High which saw her flying around Northern Ireland in a helicopter in 2004. A weekly entertainment show called First Stop followed, and she also hosted Would You Pass The 11+ and coverage of Children in Need. She presented the BBC Northern Ireland cookery show, Spill the Beans in 2005.

Outside Northern Ireland, Lampard co-hosted BBC Two's Let Me Entertain You with Brian Conley and in July 2007, she became co-host of The One Show on BBC One, replacing Myleene Klass. She and Adrian Chiles hosted the show for three years. In January 2010, Northern Irish comedian Patrick Kielty was a guest on The One Show, when he revealed her mobile phone number to the camera. After being bombarded with calls and text messages, she changed her telephone number.

In October 2009, Lampard co-presented Britain's Classroom Heroes alongside Jeremy Vine on BBC Two. In 2009, she occasionally presented The National Lottery Draws on BBC One. In March 2010, she co-hosted a segment of the Sport Relief telethon with Gary Lineker.

When Adrian Chiles left the BBC in 2010, there was a great deal of speculation on whether she would extend her BBC contract or move to ITV. After the speculation, Lampard also left The One Show to join ITV as the co-host of Daybreak following Adrian Chiles' departure from the BBC to ITV. Questions were raised in Parliament over the size and scale of the proposed £900,000 per year two-year BBC contract. Shortly after she fired her long-term manager and signed with Chiles' management company, on 20 June 2010, the BBC announced that it had withdrawn an offer to extend her current contract. Later that day ITV plc (owners of GMTV) announced she would again partner Chiles by co-hosting the revamped breakfast show with him, and also hosting other entertainment programmes. On 8 July 2010, the BBC confirmed that she was not returning to The One Show after the programme returned from the World Cup break on 12 July.

In September 2016, it was announced that Lampard would return to the BBC to co-present Christine and Adrian's Friendship Test. She co-presented the three-part series with Adrian Chiles on BBC Northern Ireland in November 2017.

ITV
She moved to ITV less than three hours after the BBC had withdrawn their £1 million offer for her to remain on the channel. She joined ITV on a four-year contract worth £4 million.

On 6 September 2010, she joined Adrian Chiles to host ITV Breakfast's Daybreak. The programme suffered mixed reviews and poor viewing figures in its first weeks on air, and Lampard herself was the subject of criticism. On 18 November 2011, she and co-presenter Adrian Chiles were replaced by Dan Lobb and Kate Garraway who presented on an interim basis. In September 2012, they were replaced by Aled Jones and Lorraine Kelly.

In February 2011, Lampard presented a game show pilot for ITV called Control, but it was not commissioned for a series. From 2011 until 2015, she co-hosted ITV's Christmas telethon Text Santa. In 2011, 2014 and 2015, she co-hosted the charity appeal with Phillip Schofield and with Paddy McGuinness in 2012 and 2013. She has hosted a number of ITV Specials, including Simply Red: For the Last Time in 2010, Duran Duran: One Night Only in 2011 and Michael Flatley: A Night to Remember in 2014. On Boxing Day 2012, she presented That Dog Can Dance.

In 2011, she became Phillip Schofield's co-presenter on Dancing on Ice, replacing Holly Willoughby. She presented three series of the show between 2012 and 2014 when it came to an end after the ninth series on 9 March 2014. For each episode of Dancing on Ice, Lampard was paid £24,163. When she was hosting the show, she was the highest paid female television star, earning around £400 per minute. Dancing on Ice returned in January 2018. Holly Willoughby returned to present with Phillip Schofield, meaning Lampard no longer appears.

On 11 May 2011, she presented The National Movie Awards. In 2013, Lampard presented a six-part series called Off The Beaten Track. On 3 March 2014, it was announced the show had been axed.

She is a frequent stand-in host on This Morning, subbing whenever Phillip Schofield or Holly Willoughby are unable to appear.

On 23 December 2014, Lampard co-hosted one-off documentary Roman Britain From the Air with Michael Scott. On 27 December 2014, she hosted the one-off magic special Darcy Oake: Edge of Reality and acted as Darcy_Oake's assistant in two illusions, first being made to appear on a large motorcycle and then being sawed in half in Oake's Clearly Impossible sawing illusion.

In 2015, Lampard presented the six-part documentary series Wild Ireland which saw her travel across the Wild Atlantic Way in Ireland. In October 2016, she was a guest panellist on an episode of Loose Women. She guest anchored numerous episodes of the show before becoming a permanent anchor.

Since February 2017, Lampard has guest presented numerous episodes of the ITV Breakfast show, Lorraine., and is the regular stand-in for Lorraine Kelly during school breaks.

UKTV
In October 2016, Lampard co-presented Celebrity Haunted Hotel Live for UKTV's W channel. The show, which she co-hosted alongside Matt Richardson and Jamie East, aired for five consecutive nights from 27–31 October.

In 2018, Lampard and Richardson presented Celebrity Haunted Mansion for the W channel. It aired for five consecutive nights from 21–25 February.

Strictly Come Dancing

In 2008, Lampard took part in the sixth series of Strictly Come Dancing, in which she was partnered with professional dancer Matthew Cutler.

Lampard and Cutler were eliminated on 30 November 2008, leaving the competition in fifth place, after Rachel Stevens and Vincent Simone beat them in the dance-off.

Radio
At the beginning of her career, Lampard worked at Belfast Citybeat as a newsreader and presenter, working with Stephen Nolan.

From January to March 2015, Lampard presented a Sunday afternoon programme called Sunday Lunch from 3–4pm on Magic Radio.

Film
Lampard was the voice of a radio newsreader in the 1998 Northern Irish film Divorcing Jack, and the voice of Sandra in the 2010 film A Turtle's Tale: Sammy's Adventures.

Other work
She set up Chrisola Entertainment Limited in 2009 and is the company's director. In 2010 and 2011, Lampard was on the judging panel for the Pride of Britain Awards. She released a 60-minute fitness DVD called Christine Bleakley – The Workout in December 2011.

On 20 March 2010, Lampard made her stand-up comedy debut when she took part in Channel 4's Comedy Gala, a benefit show in aid of Great Ormond Street Children's Hospital, filmed at the O2 Arena in London.

In August 2014, Lampard was announced as the new brand ambassador for Soft & Gentle anti-perspirant. She became an ambassador for BT Call Protect in January 2017.

Awards
In November 2010, Lampard was awarded the title 'Top TV Host' at the 2010 Cosmopolitan Ultimate Women of the Year Awards.

Personal life
Lampard dated Belfast Giants ice hockey player Curtis Bowen as she started her TV career. After breaking up with him in 2003, she dated Dublin restaurant owner Christian Stokes to whom she got engaged in 2004. She was then in a relationship with entrepreneur Mark Beirne for three years until they split in January 2009.

In October 2009, she began a relationship with English footballer Frank Lampard. The couple got married on 20 December 2015, and she is the stepmother to his two daughters from a previous marriage. On 21 September 2018, they had a baby girl. On 15 March 2021, it was announced that they had a baby boy.

Charity
Lampard is a Northern Ireland ambassador for The Prince's Trust. In 2010, she did a water skiing challenge, raising £1,321,623 for Sport Relief, making her the first person ever to water-ski across the English Channel. In the same year, her co-host on The One Show, Adrian Chiles grew a beard, which was later shaved off by Lampard for Sport Relief, raising £60,000 in the process. In 2012, Lampard took part in a 5 km run for Cancer Research UK with Heidi Range and Roxanne Pallett.

Lampard is a patron for the Sparks children's charity. In 2015, she hosted the charity's winter ball alongside Jon Culshaw. She also supported the Text Santa appeal and presented their annual telethon from 2011 until 2015.

Filmography

Television

Film

Radio

See also
 List of Strictly Come Dancing contestants

References

External links

Official Twitter

1979 births
BBC television presenters
Association footballers' wives and girlfriends
ITV Breakfast presenters and reporters
Television presenters from Northern Ireland
Living people
People educated at Bloomfield Collegiate School
People from Newtownards
Christine